Town Fields is a large area of public land in Intake, Doncaster, South Yorkshire, England. It was historically used by Hall Cross School in Doncaster.

Geography of Doncaster
Parks and open spaces in South Yorkshire